The "Bambi effect" in LGBT slang denotes a young gay man's foray into heterosexuality: "the turning of a young (otherwise homosexual) man's fancy to (heterosexual) love" by reference to "the 'twitter-pated' Bambi" leaving Thumper in the 1942 movie Bambi. In The Gay Report, it was described as the effect "where the young males in spring all suddenly turn their attention away from each other towards females with puffy cheeks, red lips, batting eyelashes, etc.—where even Bambi and Thumper don't need each other any more".

See also 
 Bi-curious
 Sexual fluidity

References 

Bambi
LGBT slang
Metaphors referring to people
Bisexuality
Adolescent sexuality
Men and sexuality
Same-sex sexuality